Jo-Anne Bench is a death metal bassist from Leamington Spa, England, who is best known as the bassist for Bolt Thrower. She has performed on all of the band's albums, but not on any of their demos.

Bench joined the band in 1987, shortly after Gavin Ward switched from bass guitar to guitar. At the time, she was Ward's long-time girlfriend and notable as one of a few female members in a commercially successful death metal band. Bolt Thrower were active until 2016, when they decided to disband following the death of drummer Martin Kearns the previous year.

She contributed guest vocals (spoken word) on the track "Resurrected For Massive Torture" by The Project Hate MCMXCIX on the 2005 album "Armageddon March Eternal – Symphonies of Slit Wrists".

Equipment
 BC Rich Ironbird
 Peavey T-Max
 Ibanez Tube Screamer
 2 x Laney 2x15

References

Bolt Thrower members
English heavy metal bass guitarists
Living people
Year of birth missing (living people)
People from Leamington Spa
Women bass guitarists
Women in metal